Two ships of the United States Navy have been named USS Crosley in honor of Walter S. Crosley.

 , was a destroyer escort commissioned in 1944
 , was a high speed transport commissioned in 1944

United States Navy ship names